Pleak is a village in Fort Bend County, Texas, United States, within the Houston–Sugar Land–Baytown metropolitan area. It is on Texas State Highway 36 south of Rosenberg. Its population was 1,044 at the 2010 census.

Geography

Pleak is south of the center of Fort Bend County, at 29°29'3" North, 95°48'36" West (29.484144, –95.810087).

Demographics

As of the 2000 census, 947 people, 318 households and 269 families resided in the village. The population density was 473.8 people per square mile (182.8/km2). There were 325 housing units at an average density of 162.6/sq mi (62.7/km2). The racial makeup of the village was 80.04% White, 4.33% African American, 0.32% Native American, 0.32% Asian, 0.00% Pacific Islander, 13.94% from other races, and 1.06% from two or more races. 29.25% of the population were Hispanic or Latino of any race.

There were 318 households, out of which 38.4% had children under the age of 18 living with them, 71.1% were married couples living together, 8.5% had a female householder with no husband present, and 15.1% were non-families. 12.6% of all households were made up of individuals, and 4.1% had someone living alone who was 65 years of age or older. The average household size was 2.98 and the average family size was 3.22.

In the village, the population was spread out, with 27.1% under the age of 18, 8.3% from 18 to 24, 27.9% from 25 to 44, 28.2% from 45 to 64, and 8.4% who were 65 years of age or older. The median age was 38 years. For every 100 females, there were 98.1 males. For every 100 females age 18 and over, there were 100.0 males.

The median income for a household in the village was $52,188, and the median income for a family was $56,364. Males had a median income of $35,313 versus $25,625 for females. The per capita income for the village was $20,773. 4.5% of the population and 3.4% of families were below the poverty line. 6.0% of those under the age of 18 and 0.0% of those 65 and older were living below the poverty line.

Government and infrastructire
Fort Bend County does not have a hospital district. OakBend Medical Center serves as the county's charity hospital which the county contracts with.

Education
Most of Pleak is a part of the Lamar Consolidated Independent School District while a small portion is in the Needville Independent School District.

The LCISD portion is zoned to Wright Junior High School (grades 6-8), and Randle High School. The LCISD portion was zoned to Meyer Elementary, Navarro Middle School, George Junior High, and B.F. Terry High School. Wright and Randle opened in 2021.

The Needville portion is zoned to Needville High School.

Gallery

References

External links
Village of Pleak official website

Villages in Fort Bend County, Texas
Villages in Texas
Greater Houston